Rocar De Simon U412-DAF was a model produced by the Romanian bus and trolleybus manufacturer Rocar. It had De Simon bodywork and DAF engine. Only two U412-DAF were produced, operating in Bucharest with park numbers #900 and #901. They were scrapped in 2008 and 2009.

See also
Rocar De Simon U412
Rocar De Simon U412-260
Rocar De Simon U412E

References

Gallery

Transport in Romania
Buses

it:Rocar De Simon U412
ro:Rocar de Simon